Zakaria I Mkhargrdzeli was Armenian landholder in Kingdom of Georgia and vassal of Orbeli family during the 12th century.

References

House of Mkhargrdzeli
Military personnel from Georgia (country)
12th-century people from Georgia (country)
Year of birth unknown